The Great Southern Railways (GSR) Class 495 consisted of a single 0-4-0ST built by Peckett and Sons and originally supplied to Allman & Co., Distillers of Bandon, County Cork in 1920.  It was purchased in 1930 fby the GSR for use on Victoria Quays section of the Cork City Railways where it had the ability to negotiate tight curves and was the only locomotive permitted to work the sharp curves to Anderson's Quay.  From the mid 1930s it appears to have been used only intermittently and was withdrawn in 1949.

References

0-4-0ST locomotives
5 ft 3 in gauge locomotives
Railway locomotives introduced in 1920
Scrapped locomotives
Steam locomotives of Ireland
Peckett locomotives